Saracco is an Italian surname and may refer to:

People
 Gaetano Saracco (1856–1922), Italian choreographer and dancer
 Giuseppe Saracco (1821–1907),  former Prime Minister of Italy (1900–1901)
 Umberto Saracco (born 1994), Italian football player
 Cristian Saracco (born 1976); see Cross-country skiing at the 2006 Winter Olympics – Men's 15 kilometre classical

Other uses
 Saracco Cabinet (24 June 1900 – 15 February 1901), a Kingdom of Italy cabinet led by Prime Minister Giuseppe Saracco